The 2017–18 USHL season was the 39th season of the United States Hockey League as an all-junior league. The regular season ran from October 6, 2017, to April 14, 2018. The regular season champions, the Waterloo Black Hawks, were awarded the Anderson Cup. The playoff champions, the Fargo Force, were awarded the Clark Cup.

League changes
The Bloomington Thunder were rebranded as the Central Illinois Flying Aces.

While the alignment remained the same from the previous season, the league increased the number of teams that qualify for the playoffs from eight to twelve. The top two seeds in each conference now have a bye in the first round. The third and fourth conference seeds than host the fifth and sixth conference seeds in a best-of-three series. The rest of the playoffs are a best-of-five series.

Regular season
Final standings:

Eastern Conference

Western Conference

x = clinched playoff berth; y = clinched conference title; z = clinched regular season title

Post season awards

USHL awards

All-USHL First Team

Source

All-USHL Second Team

Source

All Rookie First Team

Source

All Rookie Second Team

Clark Cup playoffs

References

External links
 Official website of the United States Hockey League

United States Hockey League seasons
USHL